The 2003 NFL draft was the procedure by which National Football League (NFL) teams selected amateur college football players. The draft is known officially as the "NFL Annual Player Selection Meeting" and has been conducted annually since 1936. The draft was held April 26–27, 2003 at the Theatre at Madison Square Garden in New York City, New York. The league also held a supplemental draft after the regular draft and before the regular season.

The draft was broadcast on ESPN and ESPN2 beginning at noon on Saturday, April 26 and beginning at 11:00 am on Sunday, April 27. The draft consisted of seven rounds, with teams selecting in the reverse order of the finish the previous season. There were 32 compensatory picks distributed among 15 teams, with five teams each receiving four additional selections. In addition, the Houston Texans, who started play as an expansion franchise the previous season, were granted a supplemental selection in the middle of each of the draft's final five rounds, plus the final selection in the final two rounds.

There was little drama when the draft began with the Cincinnati Bengals selecting Carson Palmer, as Palmer had agreed to contract terms with the Bengals the previous day. He became the first Heisman Trophy winner selected first overall in the draft since Vinny Testaverde in 1987. The event ended nearly 30 hours later with Ryan Hoag being chosen by the Oakland Raiders with the final pick and thus gaining the distinction of "Mr. Irrelevant".

The draft took an odd turn with the Minnesota Vikings' pick in the first round.  The Vikings were apparently attempting to consummate a trade when their fifteen-minute time allowance elapsed.  The Jaguars who selected next were quick to pounce, turning in their card to select QB Byron Leftwich immediately after the Vikings' time elapsed.  The Panthers also took advantage of the gaffe, selecting OT Jordan Gross before the Vikings recovered and selected DT Kevin Williams. Nevertheless, the mistake may have worked in the Vikings' favor as Williams went on to be a mainstay in their team, missing only four games in his first 10 seasons in the NFL and making six Pro Bowls.

The colleges with the most players selected in the draft were Florida, Miami and Tennessee which each had eight players chosen. Meanwhile, Penn State and Miami each had four players selected in the first round. Eleven defensive linemen were selected in round one, eclipsing the previous record of nine, set in 2001. Ten underclassmen were taken in the first round, including three of the first four overall selections. The first round lasted nearly five hours. The Buffalo Bills selection of Miami's Willis McGahee as the first running back off the board was notable because he was recovering from a career-threatening injury he suffered in the Fiesta Bowl which it was believed could have caused him to miss the upcoming season.

This draft is notable for its excellent undrafted players, including longtime Dallas Cowboys quarterback Tony Romo and longtime San Diego Chargers tight end Antonio Gates.

As of 2021, the 2003 draft is the most recent draft with no remaining active players; the last active player from this draft was third-round tight end Jason Witten, who played his last game in 2020 for the relocated Las Vegas Raiders.

The 262 players chosen in the draft were in the following positions:



Player selections

Trades
In the explanations below, (D) denotes trades that took place during the draft, while (PD) indicates trades completed pre-draft.

Round one

Round two

Round three

Round four

Round five

Round six

Round seven

Notes

Supplemental draft selections
For each player selected in the Supplemental Draft, the team forfeited its pick in that round in the draft of the following season.

Notable undrafted players

Hall of Famers

 Troy Polamalu, strong safety from USC, taken 1st round 16th overall by the Pittsburgh Steelers.
Inducted: Professional Football Hall of Fame Class of 2020.

References
General references
 
 
 
 
 

Trade references

Specific references

National Football League Draft
NFL Draft
Draft
Madison Square Garden
NFL draft
NFL Draft
American football in New York City
2000s in Manhattan
Sporting events in New York City